Marcel N. Gleyre (June 17, 1910 – March 22, 1996) was an American gymnast. He competed in the men's vault event at the 1932 Summer Olympics. Gleyre was born in Switzerland, though his place of birth is variously listed as being Sainte-Croix or Neuchâtel.

Gleyre graduated from Seton Hall University earning an undergraduate degree and receiving a masters degree in 1935. He later was a teacher at Union Hill High School and coached their gymnastics team and served with the United States Navy during World War II. He was the long-time owner of an embroidery company in West New York, New Jersey. He lived in Wyckoff, New Jersey and moved to Madison, New Jersey, where he died at his home there at the age of 85.

References

External links
 

1910 births
1996 deaths
American male artistic gymnasts
Olympic gymnasts of the United States
Gymnasts at the 1932 Summer Olympics
Sportspeople from the canton of Vaud
People from Madison, New Jersey
People from Wyckoff, New Jersey
Seton Hall University alumni
Swiss emigrants to the United States
United States Navy personnel of World War II
20th-century American people